Lorenzo Campeggi (1547–1585) was a Roman Catholic prelate who served as Bishop of Cervia (1582–1585), Apostolic Nuncio to Venice (1581–1585), and Apostolic Nuncio to Naples (1577–1580).

Biography
Lorenzo Campeggi was born in Bologna, Italy in 1547.
In May 1577, he was appointed during the papacy of Pope Gregory XIII as Apostolic Nuncio to Naples; he resigned from the position on 5 Jan 1580.
On 6 May 1581, he was appointed during the papacy of Pope Gregory XIII as Apostolic Nuncio to Venice; he resigned from the position on 22 Jun 1585.
On 8 Jan 1582, he was appointed during the papacy of Pope Gregory XIII as Bishop of Cervia.
He served as Bishop of Cervia until his death on 6 Nov 1585.

References

External links and additional sources
 (for Chronology of Bishops)
 (for Chronology of Bishops)
 (for Chronology of Bishops)
 (for Chronology of Bishops)

16th-century Italian Roman Catholic bishops
Bishops appointed by Pope Gregory XIII
1547 births
1585 deaths
Apostolic Nuncios to the Kingdom of Naples
Apostolic Nuncios to the Republic of Venice